Bastien Maïa (born April 18, 1997) is a French professional ice hockey forward currently playing for Dragons de Rouen in the Ligue Magnus.

Maïa previously played 30 games in Liiga for SaiPa, making his debut for the team during the 2017-18 season. On November 26, 2018, Maïa returned to his native France and signed for Gothiques d'Amiens.

On May 10, 2019, Maïa joined fellow Ligue Magnus side Dragons de Rouen.

References

External links

1997 births
Living people
Dragons de Rouen players
French ice hockey forwards
Gothiques d'Amiens players
Imatran Ketterä players
SaiPa players
Sportspeople from Rouen
French expatriate sportspeople in Finland